Truth Be Told, Part 1 is the first extended play by Greyson Chance. It contains five original songs, and was released on November 19, 2012.

Background
The EP was described by critics as a taste of what was yet to come in his full next length studio album. "I changed it up on this EP and it's very different from Hold On 'til the Night. The idea behind it is that this is what music should be about Truth BeTold," Chance said in an interview with Total Girl Philippines.

Singles
"Sunshine & City Lights" is the lead single off the EP, released on October 2, 2012. The music video premiered on Vevo on November 16, 2012, and was directed by Clarence Fuller.

Track listing

Release history

References

Geffen Records EPs
Eleveneleven albums
2012 EPs
Greyson Chance albums